Gustine Lake was a small, man-made lake located in the East Falls section of Northwest Philadelphia. Today, it is the site of the Gustine Lake Interchange, located between Kelly Drive and U.S. Route 1.  As late as 1954, this lake was part of the Wissahickon Valley Park.  The Gustine Lake Interchange connects the Schuylkill Expressway with the Roosevelt Expressway.

References

Schuylkill River
Reservoirs in Pennsylvania
Bodies of water of Philadelphia